West Azerbaijan's codes are 17, 27 and 37. In public cars, Taxis and Governal cars the letter is always the same. But in simple cars this letter (ب) depends on the city.

17
17 is Orumieh county's code and all of the letters are for Orumieh.

27

Road transport in Iran
Transportation in West Azerbaijan Province